William "Buck" Rogers (born May 6, 1928) was a Canadian football player who played for the Ottawa Rough Riders, Saskatchewan Roughriders, and Winnipeg Blue Bombers. He won the Grey Cup with Ottawa in 1951.

References

1928 births
Canadian football people from Ottawa
Players of Canadian football from Ontario
Ottawa Rough Riders players
Possibly living people
Saskatchewan Roughriders players
Winnipeg Blue Bombers players